Richard Fiennes may refer to:
Richard Fiennes, 7th Baron Dacre (1415–1483), English knight 
Richard Fiennes, 6th Baron Saye and Sele (1520–1573), MP for Oxfordshire (UK Parliament constituency), 1547
Richard Fiennes, 7th Baron Saye and Sele (1555–1613), MP for Oxfordshire, Banbury and Whitchurch, 1584–1586
Richard Fiennes, see Lundy#Civil war